The  are famous, pious followers of the Jōdo Shinshū sect of Japanese Buddhism.

Myōkōnin means "a wondrous, excellent person". It is used for a devout follower of Jōdo Shinshū, who lives a life of total dedication to Amida and whose acts and sayings, though they often run counter to common sense, reveal the depth of faith and true humanity".

Myōkōnin were largely unheard of in the West until D. T. Suzuki introduced them in his lectures and writings on Jōdo Shinshū.  Most myōkōnin left behind very little writing, but in the case of Saichi, he left behind a prolific amount of poetry expressing his devotion to Amida Buddha.

Myōkōnin have been documented through Japanese history, from the Tokugawa period to the modern period.

References 
 
 http://purelandnotes.com/pln_1/ag3d.htm
 http://shin-westhartford.tripod.com/id18.html
 http://www.dictionaryofspiritualterms.com/public/Glossaries/terms.aspx?ID=394
 http://www.threewheels.co.uk/index.php?option=com_content&task=view&id=14&Itemid=9

́